Juan Díaz may refer to:

Fiction
 The Life Work of Juan Diaz 
 short story by Ray Bradbury, published in September, 1963, Playboy magazine, and in Bradbury's 1964 anthology The Machineries of Joy
 (television) fourth episode in season ten of The Alfred Hitchcock Hour first broadcast on October 26, 1964, adapted from the short story

People
Juan Díaz Prendes (born 28 June 1977) is a Spanish retired footballer who played as a midfielder.

Juan Díaz (boxer) (born 1983), Mexican-American boxer
Juan Díaz (Chilean boxer) (born 1935), Chilean boxer
Juan Díaz (conquistador) (1480–1549), Spanish conquistador
Juan Díaz (first baseman) (born 1974), Cuban baseball player
Juan Díaz (friar) (died 1651), Salvadoran friar known for writing an early Salvadoran work
Juan Díaz (shortstop) (born 1988), Dominican baseball shortstop
Juan Díaz (taekwondo) (born 1981), Venezuelan taekwondo practitioner
Juan Díaz Canales (born 1972), Spanish comics artist
Juan Díaz Pardeiro (born 1976), Spanish actor in Aquí no hay quien viva
Juan Díaz Prendes (born 1977), Spanish association football player
Juan Díaz Sánchez (1948–2013), Spanish association football player
Juan Díaz de Solís (1470–1516), Spanish navigator
Juan Alberto Díaz (born 1985), Salvadoran footballer
Juan Américo Díaz (1944–2013), Bolivian footballer
Juan Antonio Díaz (born 1961), Argentine boxer, competed in 1988 Summer Olympics
Juan David Díaz (born 1987), Colombian footballer
Juan García Díaz (1940–2013), Spanish footballer
Juan Ignacio Díaz (born 1998), Argentine footballer
Juan Manuel Díaz (born 1987), Uruguayan football (soccer) player
Juan Arias Díaz (birthdate unknown), Spanish explorer and prospector

Places
Juan Díaz, Coclé, Panama
Juan Díaz, Panama City, Panama

Diaz, Juan